The men's eight competition at the 2013 Summer Universiade in Kazan took place at the Kazan Rowing Centre.

Results

Heats 
Heat 1

Heat 2

Repechage

Finals

References 

Rowing at the 2013 Summer Universiade